Leucadendron dubium, the Cederberg conebush, is a flower-bearing shrub that belongs to the genus Leucadendron and forms part of the fynbos. The plant is native to the Western Cape in the Cederberg. The plant's habitat is threatened by the rooibos tea industry.

Gallery

References

Sources

dubium